Sui Feifei (born January 29, 1979, in Qingdao, Shandong) is a Chinese basketball player who was signed with the Sacramento Monarchs of the WNBA. She was born and raised in Qingdao, Shandong in the People's Republic of China, and is 1.84 m (6 ft 1 in.) tall.

She was the MVP of the 2004–2005 WCBA season, where she led her team Bayi China Telecom to three consecutive championships. Sui was named the Women's Chinese Basketball Association's most popular player in 2002 and 2003.

On February 15, 2005, Sui signed a contract with the WNBA's Sacramento Monarchs and was drafted in April of that year, becoming the second Chinese woman basketball player to join the WNBA. As of 2006, she was playing as guard. Her teammate Miao Lijie also signed with the Monarchs.

External links 
 WNBA bio
 "Sui Feifei heads for WNBA"
 https://web.archive.org/web/20050403231449/http://www.southcn.com/sports/star/suifei/ (in Chinese)

1979 births
Living people
Basketball players at the 2004 Summer Olympics
Basketball players at the 2008 Summer Olympics
Chinese women's basketball players
Chinese expatriate basketball people in the United States
Olympic basketball players of China
Basketball players from Qingdao
Sacramento Monarchs players
Small forwards
Asian Games medalists in basketball
Basketball players at the 1998 Asian Games
Basketball players at the 2002 Asian Games
Basketball players at the 2006 Asian Games
Asian Games gold medalists for China
Asian Games silver medalists for China
Medalists at the 1998 Asian Games
Medalists at the 2002 Asian Games
Medalists at the 2006 Asian Games
Bayi Kylin players
Chinese women's basketball coaches